Qualibou, also known as the Soufrière Volcanic Center, is a 3.5 X 5 km-wide caldera on the island of Saint Lucia that formed between 32,000 and 39,000 years ago. This eruption also formed the Choiseul Tuff which covers the southeastern portion of the island.

The Pitons are two large lava domes that formed 200 to 300,000 years ago, before the formation of the caldera; ever since then, other domes have filled the caldera floor. There was a phreatic eruption in 1766 that deposited ash over a wide area.

Sulfur Springs is an active geothermal area located roughly in the center of the caldera.

In 1990, 1999 and 2000 there were shallow volcanic earthquakes located 6 km ESE of the caldera.

Gallery

References

External links
 

Calderas of North America
Geography of Saint Lucia
Volcanoes of Saint Lucia